John Metcalf MBE (born 1946) is a Welsh-Canadian composer. He has worked in many forms, including large-scale operas, choral and orchestral works, and chamber music, both instrumental and vocal.  His music is tonal, and is often rhythmically complex, with much use of polyrhythms.

Biography
John Metcalf was born in Swansea in 1946, and spent his childhood on the Gower Peninsula, at Reynoldston and Penmaen. When he was six, the family  moved to Cardiff, where his father had taken a new job. He was educated at Dean Close School, Cheltenham. He intended to read classics at university, but he sent a composition to the composer, Alun Hoddinott, who encouraged him to instead study music at Cardiff University.

In 1969 he founded the Vale of Glamorgan Festival, and remained its director until 1985. During this period he also composed his first opera, The Journey (1979).

In 1986 he moved to Canada, to teach on the Music Theatre course at the Banff Centre in Alberta. He was afterwards appointed Artistic Director of the programme and Composer-in-residence. At Banff he composed his second opera, Tornrak, with a libretto by Michael Wilcox, which draws on Inuit musical traditions; and this and other operas were workshopped there.

In 1991 he returned to Britain and settled at Llanfair Clydogau, near Lampeter, Ceredigion. There he built an energy-saving house from reclaimed materials.  He resumed direction of the Vale of Glamorgan Festival, which he made a festival presenting the work of living composers only.

Alongside his composing work, he was Artistic Director of the Banff Centre for ten years, and Director of the Swansea Festival until 2007.

He is Artistic Director of the Vale of Glamorgan Festival, and also teaches at the annual MusicFest Aberystwyth.

In 2012 he was appointed a Member of the Order of the British Empire (MBE) in the New Year honours, for services to music.

His seventh opera, Under Milk Wood: An Opera, with a text adapted from the play for voices by Dylan Thomas, was premiered at Taliesin Arts Centre, Swansea in April 2014.

On 12/13 March 2021, marking the year of John Metcalf’s 75tth birthday, the School of Music, Drama and Performance of Bangor University, in collaboration with the Bangor Music Festival and Tŷ Cerdd, held an online symposium presenting talks on his music. Metcalf himself answered questions and there were also performances, including premieres of his music.

Selected works
 Auden Songs, voice and piano (1973)
 The Great Question Mark, soprano and orchestra (or piano, 1983)
 The Crossing, music theatre (1984)
 The Boundaries of Time, chorus and orchestra (1985)
 Harp Scrapbook, solo harp (1992)
 Inner Landscapes, piano (1994)
 Paradise Haunts, violin and piano (1995 - orchestrated 1999)
 Kafka’s Chimp, opera for 5 singers, 2 dancers and chamber ensemble (1996)
 Airstream, clarinet and piano (1997)
 Light Music, piano four hands (1997)
 Dances from Forgotten Places, chamber orchestra (1999)
 Mapping Wales, string quarter or string orchestra (2000)
 Passus, large orchestra (2000)
 Transports, clarinet, violin, cello and piano (2000)
 Three Mobiles, piano (2001, version for string orchestra and harp 2003)
 Plain Chants, acapella choir (2003)
 Cello Symphony (2004)
 A Chair in Love, comic opera for 4 singers and wind quintet (2005)
 Line Dance, string orchestra (2005)
 In Time of Daffodils, baritone and orchestra (or piano - 2006)
 Mountains Blue Like Sea, cello and piano (2006)
 Paths of Song (Llwybrau Cân) for string quartet (2007)
 Septet, harp, flute, clarinet and string quartet (2008)
 Under Milk Wood, opera (2014)
 Sextet, piano and wind (2016)
 Octet (2018)
 Six Palindromes, chamber ensemble (2018)

Discography
Several of Metcalf's works are available on the album "In Time of Daffodils".  This includes Paradise Haunts, Three Mobiles and In Time of Daffodils.  These pieces are performed by the BBC National Orchestra of Wales.  (Excerpts from Paradise Haunts were used as part of the Queensland Ballet Company production of A Midsummer Night's Dream.) A complete discography is given on the composer's website.

A recording of Under Milk Wood: An Opera featuring the original cast is due for release by Ty Cerdd records on 27 October 2014.

References

External links
John Metcalf's official website
Vale of Glamorgan Festival
Swansea Festival of Music and the Arts
Biography at MusicFest Aberystwyth website

Canadian composers
Canadian male composers
People educated at Dean Close School
Welsh composers
Welsh male composers
1946 births
Living people
Date of birth missing (living people)
People educated at Bishop Gore School
Musicians from Swansea
Members of the Order of the British Empire